Trude Beiser (after her marriage Trude Jochum-Beiser; born 2 September 1927) is a former alpine ski racer from Austria. Born in Lech am Arlberg in Vorarlberg, she won two Olympic gold medals and a world championship. Beiser was the first female Austrian skier to win two Olympic gold medals at two Olympic Winter Games.

Competitive Career
Beiser's racing career consisted of five total competitions, two in the 1950 FIS World Ski Championships and three in the Winter Olympics of 1948 and 1952 (which also counted as FIS competitions, thus, her scoreboard holds eight total competitions). In the 1948 Winter Olympics, Beiser won the gold medal for the combined and the silver medal for the downhill competitions. She then won two medals at the 1950 World Championships in Aspen, Colorado: a gold in downhill and a silver in the giant slalom.  In 1952, she won the gold metal in downhill racing, securing the rank of champion for a second time.

Biography
Beiser married Alfred Jochum after the 1948 Olympics. Four months earlier (in regard to the World Championships), she had given birth to her first child. Once she competed in the 1952 Olympics, her country named her the Austrian sportswoman of the year. After her racing career, Beiser worked as skiing trainer and opened a café (named "Café Olympia") in her home town.

Honors and Accomplishments
In 1996, The Republic of Austria awarded Beiser with a Medal of Merit in Gold. 4 years later, she became an Honorary Freewoman of the
community of Lech and an Honorary Member of the Arlberg Ski Club.

References

External links
 
 

1927 births
Living people
Austrian female alpine skiers
Olympic alpine skiers of Austria
Olympic gold medalists for Austria
Alpine skiers at the 1948 Winter Olympics
Alpine skiers at the 1952 Winter Olympics
Olympic medalists in alpine skiing
Medalists at the 1948 Winter Olympics
Medalists at the 1952 Winter Olympics
Olympic silver medalists for Austria
Sportspeople from Vorarlberg
20th-century Austrian women
21st-century Austrian women